Edis is both a given name and a surname. Notable people with the name include:

Given name:
Edis Elkasević, Croatian shot putter
Edis Kurtić, Bosnian footballer
Edis Mulalić, Bosnian footballer
Edis Seliminski, Bulgarian footballer
Edis Görgülü, Turkish singer
Ediz Bahtiyaroğlu, Turkish footballer
Ediz Hun (born 1940), Turkish film actor
Ediz Yıldırımer (born 1993), Turkish swimmer

Surname:
Andrew Edis (born 1957), English lawyer and King's Counsel
Olive Edis (died 1955), British photographer
Robert William Edis (died 1927), British architect

Turkish masculine given names